Colletotrichum miscanthi is a falcate-spored graminicolous plant pathogenic fungi species, first isolated from warm-season grasses.

References

Further reading
Crouch, J. A., and L. A. Beirn. "Anthracnose of cereals and grasses." Fungal Diversity 39 (2009): 19.
Hyde, K. D., et al. "Colletotrichum—names in current use." Fungal Diversity39.1 (2009): 147–182.
Nishihara, N. "(Colletotrichum miscanthi (CMSC))." (2013).

External links

MycoBank

miscanthi
Fungi described in 2009